"Grapevyne" is a song by American R&B vocal group Brownstone, released on April 11, 1995 as the second single from their debut album, From the Bottom Up (1995). The song reached #49 on the US Billboard Hot 100 and #6 on the Billboard Hot R&B Singles chart. It also charted at #16 on the UK Singles Chart.

Critical reception
Steve Baltin from Cash Box noted that "Grapevyne" is the follow-up to the band's Top 5 single "If You Love Me". He wrote further, "Coming out while the latter is still locked into the top 10 ensures a high amount of interest for Brownstone’s latest single. A bit more sultry than before, Brownstone show they can play the game at night with the grinding deep voice effort. Another hit." Chuck Campbell from Knoxville News Sentinel remarked the "atmospheric emotion" on the track.

Music video
The official music video for "Grapevyne" was filmed at the Sheats–Goldstein Residence.

Charts

Weekly charts

Year-end charts

References

1994 songs
1995 singles
Brownstone (group) songs
Songs written by Dave Hall (record producer)
Song recordings produced by Dave Hall (record producer)
Hip hop soul songs
Contemporary R&B ballads
1990s ballads
Songs about infidelity